In electrochemistry, a half-cell is a structure that contains a conductive electrode and a surrounding conductive electrolyte separated by a naturally occurring Helmholtz double layer. Chemical reactions within this layer momentarily pump electric charges between the electrode and the electrolyte, resulting in a potential difference between the electrode and the electrolyte.  The typical anode reaction involves a metal atom in the electrode being dissolved and transported as a positive ion across the double layer, causing the electrolyte to acquire a net positive charge while the electrode acquires a net negative charge. The growing potential difference creates an intense electric field within the double layer, and the potential rises in value until the field halts the net charge-pumping reactions. This self-limiting action occurs almost instantly in an isolated half-cell; in applications two dissimilar half-cells are appropriately connected to constitute a Galvanic cell.

A standard half-cell consists of a metal electrode in a 1 molar (1 mol/L) aqueous solution of the metal's salt, at 298 kelvins (25 °C). The electrochemical series, which consists of standard electrode potentials and is closely related to the reactivity series, was generated by measuring the difference in potential between the metal half-cell in a circuit with a standard hydrogen half-cell, connected by a salt bridge.

The standard hydrogen half-cell:
2H+(aq) + 2e− → H2(g)

The half-cells of a Daniell cell:
Original equation
Zn + Cu2+ → Zn2+ + Cu
Half-cell (anode) of Zn
Zn → Zn2+ + 2e−
Half-cell (cathode) of Cu
Cu2+ + 2e− → Cu

See also 
 Standard electrode potential (data page)

References

Electrochemistry
Electrochemical cells